Spyridium ulicinum is a species of flowering plant in the family Rhamnaceae and is endemic to Tasmania. It is a tall shrub with linear to oblong leaves, and single or small groups of white flowers.

Description
The leaves are linear to oblong, mostly less and arranged singly, in pairs or groups of 3 near the ends of short side-branches with overlapping brown bracts at the base of each flower.

Taxonomy
This species was first formally described in 1855 by William Jackson Hooker who gave it the name Cryptandra ulicina and published the description in his journal, The Journal of Botany. In 1863, George Bentham changed the name to Spyridium ulicinum in the Flora Australiensis. The specific epithet (ulicinum) means "Ulex-like".

Distribution and habitat
Spyridium ulicinum is widespread but not common and grows in woodland in Tasmania.

References

ulicinum
Rosales of Australia
Flora of Tasmania
Taxa named by William Jackson Hooker
Plants described in 1834